Plantations of Pale Pink is a 1996 EP by Guided by Voices.

Track listing
All songs written by Robert Pollard.

Side A
 "Systems Crash" – 1:19
 "Catfood on the Earwig" – 2:27
 "The Who vs. Porky Pig" – 2:00

Side B
 "A Life in Finer Clothing" – 1:30
 "The Worryin' Song" – 1:02
 "Subtle Gear Shifting" – 3:45

References

1996 EPs
Guided by Voices EPs
Matador Records EPs